This is a discography of works by the Wire Daisies.

Studio albums
Just Another Day (2004)
Wire Daisies (2007)

Singles

Discographies of British artists
Rock music group discographies